

The Caguas City Hall (Spanish: Casa de la Alcaldía de Caguas) consists of two buildings located in the downtown area of Caguas, Puerto Rico.

The old city hall 

The original city hall building (Spanish: Antigua Casa Alcaldía) of the municipality of Caguas dates to 1856-1860, although it didn't officially become the municipal headquarters until 1887. The building is well-maintained and still preserves its original Neoclassical façade. The building was added to the National Register of Historic Places as Alcaldia de Caguas in March 22, 1989. This building hosted municipal offices until 2010 when the new city hall building was inaugurated. The building now houses several cultural institutions including a museum dedicated to the history of Caguas.

The new city hall 

The building of a new city hall was part of a project to develop and build more modern office and administrative spaces in the city. Some people, however, have criticized the continuous use of Brutalist architecture in new government buildings. The new city hall building, nicknamed "El Cacique Mayor" (Spanish for 'the major cacique'), was inaugurated in September of 2010 by Caguas mayor William Edgardo Miranda Torres.

See also 
 Architecture of Puerto Rico
 Caguas, Puerto Rico
 Caguas Museum of History

References 

Caguas, Puerto Rico
Tourist attractions in Puerto Rico
City and town halls on the National Register of Historic Places in Puerto Rico
Government buildings completed in 1856
1850s establishments in Puerto Rico
1856 establishments in the Spanish Empire
Brutalist architecture
Government buildings completed in 2010
2010 establishments in Puerto Rico